Siti Noor Halimi  (born 22 February 1984) is a Malaysian women's international futsal player who plays as a defender. She is a member of the Malaysia women's national futsal team. She won the bronze medal at the 2013 Southeast Asian Games where she scored one goal and was part of the team at the 2015 AFC Women's Futsal Championship. On club level she played for FELDA United FC in Kuala Lumpur.

References

1984 births
Living people
Malaysian women's futsal players
Place of birth missing (living people)
Futsal defenders
Southeast Asian Games bronze medalists for Malaysia
Southeast Asian Games medalists in futsal
Competitors at the 2013 Southeast Asian Games